Ilsenburg is a town in the district of Harz, in Saxony-Anhalt in Germany. It received town privileges in 1959. Owing to its surrounding of forests and mountains as well as its position on the edge of the Harz National Park, Ilsenburg is a popular tourist resort. Since 2002, it is officially an air spa.

History 
The old castle, Schloss Ilsenburg, lying on a high crag above the town, was originally an imperial stronghold and probably built by King Henry I. In 995 Emperor Otto III resided in Elysynaburg, which Henry II bestowed in 1003 upon the Bishop of Halberstadt, who converted it into a Benedictine monastery. The school attached to it enjoyed a great reputation towards the end of the 11th century. The abbey was finally devastated during the German Peasants' War in 1525.

After the Reformation the castle passed to the counts of Wernigerode, who restored it and made it their residence until 1710. Around this rock cluster numerous legends.

Geography

Ilsenburg is between Wernigerode (Saxony-Anhalt) in the east and Bad Harzburg (Lower Saxony) in the west through the Ilsetal. The Brocken is reachable through the Heinrich-Heine-Weg, that goes along the Scharfenstein and Kleiner Brocken. Ilsenburg is near the Harz National Park. To the west, there is the Harzer Grenzweg at the Green Belt Germany, which goes along the inner German border.

Town divisions

The town Ilsenburg consists of Ilsenburg proper and the Ortschaften (municipal divisions) Darlingerode and Drübeck. Darlingerode and Drübeck were independent municipalities until they were absorbed by Ilsenburg in July 2009. Other localities within the town are Plessenburg (part of Ilsenburg proper) and Oehrenfeld (part of Drübeck).

Places of interest 

 Am Kruzifix
 Ilsenburg Abbey
 Ilsenburg House
 Ilse valley and Princess Ilse
 Ilsestein
 Froschfelsen
 Market place and chemist's
 Krug Bridge over the Ilse
 former Ilsenburg Factory, today used as a residence
 Bremen Hut, a checkpoint on the Harzer Wandernadel and refuge hut in the Ilse valley

Transport 
Ilsenburg has access to the Bundesstraße 6 federal highway leading from Goslar and the Bundesautobahn 395 to Halle and the Bundesautobahn 14.

At the Ilsenburg train station rail transport is available to Vienenburg and Hanover as well as to Halle and Berlin by Regional-Express trains of the Deutsche Bahn and trains of Veolia.

Twin town 
 Bad Harzburg, Germany

References

External links
Official site
Ilsenburg Abbey 

 
Towns in the Harz